Beth Israel Congregation is a Conservative synagogue located at 116 Centre Street in Kingston, Ontario.

It was designed by Joseph William Power, architect in 1910. It is the oldest synagogue in Kingston.

Notes

Buildings and structures in Kingston, Ontario
Jewish organizations established in 1910
Synagogues in Ontario
Orthodox synagogues in Canada
1910 establishments in Ontario